Pseudovahlkampfia is a genus of Excavates

It includes the species Pseudovahlkampfia emersoni.

References 

Percolozoa
Excavata genera